Popov 2-y is a rural locality (a khutor) in Lobakinskoye Rural Settlement, Surovikinsky District, Volgograd Oblast, Russia. The population was 174 as of 2010. There are six streets.

Geography 
Popov 2-y is located 19 km northeast of Surovikino (the district's administrative centre) by road. Lobakin is the nearest rural locality.

References 

Rural localities in Surovikinsky District